Outland 3 is a collaborative album by Bill Laswell and Pete Namlook, released on April 20, 1998 by FAX +49-69/450464.

Several tracks appear to contain samples from an episode of the TV Drama  The Outer Limits titled Specimen: Unknown.

Track listing

Personnel 
Adapted from the Outland 3 liner notes.
Bill Laswell – electronics, cover art
Pete Namlook – electronics, producer

Release history

References

External links 
 Outland 3 at Bandcamp
 

1998 albums
Collaborative albums
Bill Laswell albums
Pete Namlook albums
FAX +49-69/450464 albums
Albums produced by Pete Namlook